The  Eastern League season began on approximately April 1 and the regular season ended on approximately September 1. 

The New Britain Red Sox defeated the Lynn Sailors three games to one to win the Eastern League Championship Series.

Regular season

Standings

Notes:
Green shade indicates that team advanced to the playoffs
Bold indicates that team advanced to ELCS
Italics indicates that team won ELCS

Playoffs

Semi-finals Series
Lynn Sailors defeated Buffalo Bisons 2 games to 0.

New Britain Red Sox defeated Reading Phillies 2 games to 1.

Championship Series
New Britain Red Sox defeated Lynn Sailors 3 games to 1.

Attendance

References

External links
1983 Eastern League Review at thebaseballcube.com

Eastern League seasons